Brian or Bryan Avery may refer to:

 Brian Avery (activist) (born 1979), American activist
 Bryan Avery (1944–2017), British architect

See also
 Avery (surname)